Dyesebel is a Filipino comic book character, conceived by Mars Ravelo and drawn by Elpidio Torres. Dyesebel is a mermaid, who eventually gains full human form through a deal with a sea-witch.

Aside appearing in Pilipino Komiks, Dyesebel also appeared in Kampeon Komiks (Champion Comics) in 1975. The story has been adapted into five films and a spin-off, throughout the timeline from 1953 to 1996. Among those who took on the role in the big screen are Eva Montes, Edna Luna (1953), Vilma Santos (1973), Alma Moreno (1978), Alice Dixson (1990), and Charlene Gonzales (1996). On the television, the iconic mermaid is portrayed by Marian Rivera (2008) and Anne Curtis (2014).

Adaptations

Films

Television series

Mars Ravelo's Dyesebel (2008)

The first TV series adaptation of Dyesebel was broadcast on GMA Network in 2008. It originally aired on April 28, 2008, and ended on October 17, 2008, completing 125 episodes. It is top billed by Marian Rivera and Dingdong Dantes in the lead roles. It was internationally aired on GMA Pinoy TV, which became a huge success to viewers abroad.

Mars Ravelo's Dyesebel (2014)

Upcoming Dyesebel television series
On December 11, 2022, it was confirmed by comedian Ogie Diaz that Andrea Brillantes has been cast in the role of Dyesebel for an upcoming television series from ABS-CBN Corporation.

On-screen actresses and actors

In the films, Dyesebel was portrayed by Filipino actresses: Edna Luna, Vilma Santos, Alma Moreno, Alice Dixson, and Charlene Gonzales. In television, she was portrayed by Marian Rivera in 2008 and Anne Curtis in 2014. She was also personified by the actress Ara Mina in a cameo appearance on Mars Ravelo's Darna (2005 TV Series).

Official list of actresses who played Dyesebel

Young Dyesebel
Carissa in Dyesebel (1978).
Carmina Villaroel in Dyesebel (1990).
Charina Scott in Dyesebel (1996).
Kirsten Jane Sigrist in Dyesebel (2008 TV series).
Ashley Sarmiento in Dyesebel (2014 TV series).

Cameo Appearance
Ara Mina in Mars Ravelo's Darna (2005 TV Series).

Official list of actors who played Fredo 

Young Fredo
Robert Ortega in Dyesebel (1990) (renamed Edward)
Arkin Luciano Magalona in Dyesebel (2008 TV series).
Giacobbe Whitworth in Dyesebel (2014 TV series).

Collected editions

See also
Panday (comics)
Zuma (comics)
Philippine mythical creatures

References

External links

 
Dyesebel illustrations, photographs and screenshots in Philippine comics, film and television at MarsRavelo.Tripod.com
Dyesebel at the International Catalogue of Superheroes
Philippine Comics – The most comprehensive library of Filipino comics on the internet.
 
 
 
 
 
 
 
 

Dyesebel
Fictional mermen and mermaids
Philippine comics titles
1952 comics debuts
Comics characters introduced in 1952
Philippine comics adapted into films
Comics adapted into television series
Philippine fantasy films
Films based on Philippine comics
Tagalog-language films
Fictional Filipino people
Female characters in comics
1953 films
1973 films
1978 films
1990 films
1996 films
Filipino comics characters